Seven Days in January is a 1979 Spanish drama film directed by Juan Antonio Bardem about the 1977 Atocha massacre. The film won the Golden Prize at 11th Moscow International Film Festival.

Cast
 Manuel Ángel Egea as Luis María Hernando de Cabral
 Madeleine Robinson as Adelaida
 Virginia Mataix as Pilar
 Jacques François as Don Thomas
 Alberto Alonso as Cisko Kid (as Alberto Alonso López)

Production
It was produced by the communist millionaire Teodulfo Lagunero.

References

External links
 

1979 films
1979 drama films
Spanish drama films
1970s Spanish-language films
Films directed by Juan Antonio Bardem
Films about terrorism in Europe
Films set in Madrid
1970s Spanish films
Films about the Spanish Transition